Multidrug resistance-associated protein 6 (MRP6) also known as ATP-binding cassette sub-family C member 6 (ABCC6) and multi-specific organic anion transporter E (MOAT-E) is a protein that in humans is encoded by the ABCC6 gene. The protein encoded by the ABCC6 gene is a member of the superfamily of ATP-binding cassette (ABC) transporters.

ABC proteins transport various molecules across extra- and intra-cellular membranes. ABC genes are divided into seven distinct subfamilies (ABC1, MDR/TAP, MRP, ALD, OABP, GCN20, White). This protein is a member of the MRP subfamily which is involved in multidrug resistance.

Pathology
Mutations in this protein cause pseudoxanthoma elasticum (PXE).  The most common mutations, R1141X and 23-29del, account for about 25% of the found mutations.

Premature atherosclerosis is also associated with mutations in the ABCC6 gene, even in those without PXE.

Deficiency of Abcc6 in mouse models of ischemia leads to larger infarcts, which can be rescued by Abcc6 overexpression.

Location
Abcc6 gene encodes an intracellular transporter associated with mitochondrial function, located in the mitochondrial-associated membrane (MAM), whereas its substrate can be located in either MAM, cytosol or ER.
Abcc6 is primarily expressed in liver and kidney,.

References

External links
  GeneReviews/NIH/NCBI/UW entry on Pseudoxanthoma Elasticum
 
Membrane Topology Model of Human ABCC6 protein
 

ATP-binding cassette transporters